is a Japanese professional footballer who plays as a winger for  club Kashima Antlers.

Career statistics

Club
.

References

External links

1998 births
Living people
People from Gifu
Association football people from Gifu Prefecture
Ritsumeikan University alumni
Japanese footballers
Association football midfielders
J1 League players
Sanfrecce Hiroshima players
Kashima Antlers players